The Gold Coast Stars was an Australian soccer club from Gold Coast, Queensland, Australia who played in the Queensland State League.

History

Queensland State League
The Gold Coast Stars were a professional football team who entered the Queensland State League in the 2011 season. The team would go on to compile 8 wins, 2 draws and 6 losses in their first season.

PLAYERS (2012)

  Luigi Alberto Cordova Vasquez 
  Kenneth Onyema
  Bengali Sherrif
  Daniel Bina
 Markis Nebo
 Arnold Mouakor
  Blake Kallis

Notable former players
Blake Kallis
Craig Moore

Luigi Alberto Cordova Vasquez

Lyndon Dykes

Markis Nebo

See also

Gold Coast United
Football Gold Coast
Gold Coast City FC

References

External links
 

Queensland State League soccer teams
Association football clubs established in 2010
2010 establishments in Australia
Soccer teams on the Gold Coast, Queensland